The Liberty of Norton Folgate is the ninth studio album by the British band Madness, released on 18 May 2009. The band worked on the album for close to three years and it was their first album of new material since 1999's Wonderful.

Content
The 10-minute title track recounts the social history of a corner of east London that until 1900 was controlled by St Paul's Cathedral. As a "liberty" it was not legally independent, but the rights of the Crown over the land had been waived. A shortened version of the track "The Liberty of Norton Folgate" was made available on YouTube in mid May 2008. In December a boxset of the album was offered for pre-order on the Madness website; those who ordered were entitled to a digital download of the album on 20 December. Twenty-three tracks were recorded for the album, of which fifteen made it on to the album to be released in May. The twelve tracks issued in the digital download leaked onto the internet on 25 December 2008.
During concerts in Sydney, Melbourne and Adelaide at the end of March 2009, lead singer Suggs stated that "Dust Devil" would be the second single off the new album; second when accounting for the 2008 release of "NW5". It was released on 11 May, one week before the album. A third single, "Sugar and Spice" (with slightly different lyrics and intro to the album version) was released to radio in July, and on 21 July it was confirmed that it would be made available as a download single from 2 August on iTunes and 3 August from other retailers.

In November 2009 the band announced the release of a fourth single scheduled for 11 January 2010: "Forever Young", a favourite of both fans and band. Apart from several remixes, one of the single formats contains "Love Really Hurts (Without You)", a Dangermen era cover of the Billy Ocean classic. The release was put back one week and the single was released on 18 January, becoming the second single from the album to fail to chart.

It was produced by Clive Langer and Alan Winstanley, who have worked with Madness on all but one of their albums. Initial recording sessions began at Toe Rag Studios in spring 2006 with Liam Watson, who engineered and mixed Elephant by the White Stripes. The band recorded sporadically, now without Watson, until early 2008.

The band showcased a number of songs from the new album during three concerts at London's Hackney Empire in June 2008.

Reception

Critical reception to The Liberty of Norton Folgate was highly positive, with most critics hailing it as Madness' best album in their thirty-year career. The Financial Times, in a five-star review, lauded that "[at] a stage of life when they might be endlessly revisiting "Our House" and "Baggy Trousers" on the 1980s nostalgia circuit, the much-loved ska-pop band, 30 years after their debut, have ripped up the form book and delivered a knockout album." The BBC described it as a "magnificent magnum opus"  and "the most sophisticated and satisfying album of their career." Uncut and Mojo both gave the album four out of five stars, with Uncut stating it as "refreshingly, unexpectedly excellent" and "everything seems to gel – the arrangements are the best ever."
Online music magazine musicOMH said it "may just be the best thing they have ever recorded" and "it is everything you would expect of Madness and more."
The Word described it as "Peter Ackroyd writing for the Kinks, it's Sherlock Holmes in Albert Square, it's a Mike Leigh movie of Parklife, it's Passport To Pimlico meets Brick Lane, and it is Madness's masterpiece."

The album also made 3rd and 9th place, respectively, in the BBC's and Mojos "Best albums of 2009" lists (category rock & pop).

Track listing

Standard edition
This edition was released on 18 May 2009.

Special edition boxed set
This edition was made available for pre-order in late 2008 and was released on 23 March 2009.
It contains a 2-CD version of the album and an additional CD of rehearsal recordings, demos and live recordings.
Also included is a Madness "M" pin, a poster, and access to an online area that will contain additional material.

All of disc 3 contains material exclusive to this release. The seven tracks marked with a (*''') on disc 2 are also exclusive to
this release.

Disc 1

Disc 2

Disc 3 

Tracks 1–8 are rehearsal recordings, April 2007.
Tracks 10–20 recorded live at Hackney Empire, London, June 2008.

Vinyl LP

 Film 
A 64-minute-long concert film, also titled The Liberty of Norton Folgate was directed by Julien Temple. It screened at the London Independent Film Festival on 17 April 2009.

Chart performanceThe Liberty of Norton Folgate'' reached No. 5 in the UK album charts on 24 May 2009, their highest charting studio album since 7 in 1981. The album also charted at No. 1 on the UK independent album chart. The album went Gold in the UK in October 2009.

Certifications and sales

Personnel
Madness
 Graham "Suggs" McPherson – vocals  
 Cathal Smyth – vocals 
 Mike Barson – piano, keyboards
 Chris Foreman – guitar
 Mark Bedford – bass
 Lee Thompson – saxophone
 Daniel Woodgate – drums

Additional personnel
 Graham Bush – additional bass
 Rhoda Dakar – vocals on "On the Town"
 Amber Jolene – backing vocals on "Forever Young", "Dust Devil" and "Mission From Hell" 
 Sasha Paul – backing vocals on "Forever Young", "Dust Devil" and "Mission From Hell"
 Jim Parmley – percussion
 Joe Auckland – trumpet
 Steve Turner – saxophone
 Michael Kearsey – trombone
 Mark Brown – clarinet
 Dave Powell – tuba
 Sirish Kumar – tabla
 Andy Findon – Turkish clarinet, zorna, duduk
 Simon Hale – string arrangements, conductor, additional piano and keyboards on "MKII", "Fish & Chips" and "One Fine Day"
 Julian Leaper – violin
 Emil Chakalov – violin
 Martin Burgess – violin
 Sue Briscoe – violin
 Chris Pitsilledes – viola
 Nick Holland – cello
 Millennia Strings – strings 
 The London Session Orchestra led by Gavyn Wright – strings

Technical
 Clive Langer – production, mixing, initial production 
 Alan Winstanley – production, mixing
 Liam Watson – initial production 
 Finn Eiles – engineer
 Werner Freistätter – assistant engineer on "Forever Young"
 Tim Young – mastering engineer
 Paul Rider – photography
 Martin 'Cally' Callomon – art direction, design
 Nik Rose – retouching, assembly

References

External links
 
 
 The Liberty Of Norton Folgate at Rate Your Music

2009 albums
Madness (band) albums
Lucky 7 Records albums
Albums produced by Clive Langer
Albums produced by Alan Winstanley